The 1981–82 Montreal Canadiens season was the team's 73rd season. The club finished with over 100 points in the regular season, and were third overall in the NHL standings. The season involved being eliminated in the Adams Division semi-final versus the Quebec Nordiques 3 games to 2.

Offseason
Montreal along with Hartford were moved to the Adams Division which was a more geographical grouping of teams, including Boston, Buffalo and Quebec. Before the 1981 NHL Entry Draft, general manager Irving Grundman announced that Bob Berry would be the new head coach of the Canadiens.

Bob Gainey is named captain, following Serge Savard's signing with the Winnipeg Jets.

Regular season

Final standings

Schedule and results

Playoffs
The Canadiens were seeded 3rd overall in the playoffs, while their opponents, the Quebec Nordiques were seeded 10th overall. The clubs were 27 points apart in the league standings. The fifth and final game of the series went into overtime. Twenty-two seconds into overtime, Nordiques' Dale Hunter scored against Canadiens goalie Rick Wamsley to clinch the series.

Player statistics

Regular season
Scoring

Goaltending

Playoffs
Scoring

Goaltending

Awards and records

Transactions

Draft picks

Farm teams

See also
 1981–82 NHL season

References

Montreal Canadiens seasons
Montreal Canadiens season, 1981-82
Adams Division champion seasons
Montreal